Álvaro Gómez may refer to:

 Álvaro Gómez Hurtado (1919–1995), Colombian politician
 Álvaro Gómez (actor) (born 1980), Chilean actor
 Álvaro Gómez (swimmer) (born 1937), Colombian swimmer
 Álvaro Gómez (footballer), Spanish footballer
 Álvaro Gómez (cyclist) (born 1984), Colombian cyclist
 Álvaro Gómez (athlete) (born 1989), Colombian sprinter